The Autostrada A26 is a motorway in the northwestern Italian regions of Liguria and Piedmont. It is named the Autostrada dei Trafori (the Autostrada of the Tunnels) after the numerous tunnels through which it passes, both Apennine and Subalpine. It runs northwards from Genoa on the Ligurian coast, over the Apennines, and across the wide plain of the Po valley to the environs of Lake Maggiore and the mouth of the Val d’Ossola. In addition to this ‘main trunk’ of the road, there are three side branches, also of motorway class which function as link roads between the A26 and the A7, the A4 and the A8. The A26, together with these link roads, is managed by Autostrade per l'Italia S.p.A.

Route

A26 Genova – Gravellona Toce

The A26 begins from the Genoese town of Pra', which lies on the coast to the west of the city centre. (Note that the gate of Pra' is still wrongly named "Voltri", nevertheless, Voltri has anything to do with the motorway gate and that the City of Genova has formally asked for the change of its name in "Gate of Pra' "). It crosses the Apennines at the Passo del Turchino (532m) and passes through Ovada. Near Castelferro (frazione of Predosa) an eastern branch, the Autostrada A26/A7, provides links to Novi Ligure and to the Autostrada A7 (Genoa – Milan) which it joins near Spineto Scrivia, to the south of Tortona.

The A26 continues northwards until near Alessandria there is an interchange with the Autostrada A21 (Turin – Brescia). The road crosses the Po River just east of Casale Monferrato. South of Vercelli a western branch, the Autostrada A4/26, provides a connection to the Autostrada A4 (Turin – Trieste) near Santhià, and continues as the Autostrada A4/A5 to the Autostrada A5 (Turin – Aosta – Monte Bianco) which it joins at Pavone Canavese, just south of Ivrea.

Further north, between Greggio and Biandrate Vicolungo to the west of Novara, the A26 intersects with the Autostrada A4 (Turin – Trieste), and at Sesto Calende with the Autostrada A8. The road passes close to Romagnano Sesia and Ghemme where there is an exit for the Valsesia. It proceeds north-east and follows the shore of Lago Maggiore with exits for Arona, Brovello-Carpugnino, Baveno - Stresa, Verbania and Gravellona Toce. From here the Strada Statale SS 33 del Sempione continues the route northwards, initially as a superstrada (a form of expressway), to Domodossola and then via the Val Divedro to the Swiss border, affording access to the Simplon Pass.

A7/A26 Bettole – Predosa Link

The Autostrada A7/A26 Diramazione Bettole-Predosa (A7/A26) is a 17 km motorway which links the A26 near Predosa with the Autostrada A7 near Bettole (a frazione of Pozzolo Formigaro). The entire autostrada is within the Province of Alessandria. Its sole exit is for Novi Ligure and it provides a convenient means of access to both the A7 and the A26 from that town.

A4/A26 Stroppiana – Santhià Link

The Autostrada A4/A26 Diramazione Stroppiana-Santhià (A4/A26) is a 32 km motorway which links the A26 near Stroppiana with the Autostrada A4 near Santhià. It forms part of the 1,547 km European route E25 which connects Hook of Holland in the Netherlands to Palermo in Sicily. The layout of the road is level with two lanes in each direction.

A8/A26 Gallarate – Gattico Link

The Autostrada A8/A26 Diramazione Gallarate-Gattico (A8/A26) is a motorway which connects the A26 near Gattico with the Autostrada A8 near Gallarate. It forms part of the 1,290 km European route E62 which connects Nantes in western France to Genova. The road was built to provide a route for traffic from Domodossola and the Simplon Pass to Milan and thence to the parts of the peninsula to the east of the Apennines. It has two lanes in each direction from Gallarate to Sesto Calende and three from Sesto Calende to Gattico.

Footnotes

References

External links
 Autostrade per l'Italia 
 Structures on A 26 provides a list of the autostrada's viaducts and tunnels.

A26
Transport in Liguria
Transport in Piedmont
Metropolitan City of Genoa
Province of Alessandria
Province of Novara
Province of Verbano-Cusio-Ossola
Province of Vercelli